Virginia Can Company-S.H. Heironimus Warehouse is a historic factory and warehouse complex located at Roanoke, Virginia.  The "U"-shaped complex was built in 1912, and consists of an office and two factory buildings.  All three of the buildings are two stories in height and are constructed of brick on a raised foundation of poured concrete.  A second-story pedestrian bridge connects the two factory buildings and a brick hyphen connects the office building to the north factory building. The complex was built for the Virginia Can Company, the first and largest manufacturer of tin cans in Roanoke, Virginia.  After 1951, it housed a clothing factory and then the Heironimus department store warehouse.

It was listed on the National Register of Historic Places in 2006, and included in the Roanoke River and Railroad Historic District in 2013.  It is located in the Virginia Landmarks Register listed Southeast Roanoke Historic District.

References

Industrial buildings and structures on the National Register of Historic Places in Virginia
Industrial buildings completed in 1912
Buildings and structures in Roanoke, Virginia
National Register of Historic Places in Roanoke, Virginia
Individually listed contributing properties to historic districts on the National Register in Virginia
Packaging companies of the United States
Warehouses on the National Register of Historic Places
1912 establishments in Virginia